The  or National Sanatorium Matsuoka Hoyoen is a sanatorium for leprosy and ex-leprosy patients situated in Aomori, Aomori, Japan that opened in 1909.

History
The Japanese Government promulgated the first leprosy prevention law on March 19, 1907, which took effect on April 1, 1909. Japan was divided into 5 areas. The second area included Hokkaido, Miyagi Prefecture, Iwate Prefecture, Aomori Prefecture, Fukushima Prefecture, Yamagata Prefecture and Akita Prefecture. In this area, Aomori was selected for the sanatorium.

Foreigners who came into Japan after the Meiji Restoration(1868) were surprised to find leprosy patients in public areas in Japan. The Japanese Government was worried about the many leprosy patients among those who were examined for the draft at age 20.

Timeline
 April 1, 1909: Prefectural Hokubu (Northern) Hoyoin was established in Aburakawa Village Aomori-shi with 90 beds.
 October 1, 1909: It moved to the present site.
 July 1, 1941: National Sanatorium Matsuoka Hoyo-en.
 1958: The number of allotted beds reached 950.
 April 1996: The 1953 Leprosy Prevention Law was abolished.
 July 1998: The trial for compensation started.
 May 11, 2001: The trial for compensation ruled that the previous Leprosy Prevention Law was unconstitutional.
 May 25, 2001: The trial for compensation was completed. Compensation of 8-14 million yen were given to patients depending on the duration of their confinement.

Number of patients
The following table shows the number of patients held at the Sanatorium in selected years.

See also
 Leprosy in Japan

References

Hospital buildings completed in 1909
Hospitals in Japan
Leper hospitals
Hospitals established in 1909
Leprosy in Japan
1909 establishments in Japan